The 2008 Rafael Nadal tennis season officially began on January 1 with the start of the 2008 ATP Tour. This season is considered to be one of Nadal's best: he won eight titles in 2008, including two majors and the Olympic gold medal. In addition, Nadal also won three Masters titles — Monte-Carlo, Hamburg, and Toronto. Nadal's 32-match winning streak in 2008 is the longest across three surfaces in tennis history. He won the French Open for the loss of no sets and just 41 games, in one of the most comprehensive major performances of all time. Nadal also won Wimbledon, defeating rival and five-time defending champion Roger Federer in what is widely recognized as the greatest tennis match in history. He then won the Olympic gold medal at Beijing, which clinched the world No. 1 ranking for the first time. He ascended to the top spot after 160 consecutive weeks as the world No. 2. Nadal would hold the No. 1 ranking for the rest of the season and finish the year ranked No. 1 for the first time in his career.

Year summary 

Nadal kickstarted his season with a runner-up showing at the Indian city of Chennai. He then played the first Grand Slam of the year, the Australian Open. Nadal raced through the tournament before a shock straight-sets loss at the hands of Frenchman Jo-Wilfried Tsonga in the semifinals. Nadal then had a form slump, winning just three of his next five, and six of his next nine matches. Nadal had his second runner-up result that year at Miami, losing to long-term rival Nikolay Davydenko. Nadal then won his fourth consecutive Monte-Carlo Masters title, losing just 29 games in 5 matches. He followed that up with his second tournament win of the year at the Barcelona Open Banco Sabadell. Nadal's winning streak of 10 matches was snapped when compatriot Juan Carlos Ferrero stunned him in the second round of the Rome Masters, where Nadal was a three-time defending champion. Nadal then regrouped and began a 32-match winning streak across clay, grass, and hard courts, which is the longest streak on three surfaces in the history of the sport. He won his first Hamburg Masters title in May, and followed it up with a brilliant performance to win his fourth consecutive French Open title, losing just 4 games in the final. Nadal's streak continued with his first grass-court title at Queen's Club in London, and then his first-ever Wimbledon, where he outlasted Federer in what is considered the greatest match in tennis history. Nadal then won his third Masters title and first hard-court title of the year at Toronto. His streak was finally ended in the semifinals of the Cincinnati Masters by Novak Djokovic. Nadal then entered the Summer Olympics at Beijing, and became the first top-5 ranked player to win the Olympic Gold in the history of the sport. This win also catapulted Nadal to the top of the rankings for the first time in his career. Nadal then made his second hard-court Grand Slam semifinal at the US Open, before losing to Andy Murray in four tight sets. He then helped guide Spain into the Davis Cup Final, notching up wins over Sam Querrey and Andy Roddick. Nadal ended the year as World #1.

Spring hard-court season

Chennai Open 
Nadal began the year by participating in the Chennai Open in Chennai, India. Nadal defeated Carlos Moyá in the semi-finals in (at the time) the longest three-set match in history, 6–7(3), 7–6(8), 7–6(1), lasting three hours and fifty-four minutes. An exhausted Nadal went on to lose in the finals to Mikhail Youzhny 6–0, 6–1.

Australian Open 
Nadal played his second tournament of the year at the Australian Open. Nadal stormed through the tournament, dropping no sets until he was shocked by the then world number 38 Jo-Wilfried Tsonga in the semi-finals. He beat Viktor Troicki in the first round 7–6(3), 7–5, 6–1. He then demolished Frenchman Florent Serra, 6–0, 6–2, 6–2. In the third round, he defeated another Frenchman, Gilles Simon, 7–5, 6–2, 6–3. In the round of 16, he beat his third Frenchman of the tournament, Paul-Henri Mathieu, after Mathieu retired when he was down 4–6, 0–3. In the quarter-finals, he beat Jarkko Nieminen, 7–5, 6–3, 6–1. Nadal's impressive run came to a halt when Frenchman Jo-Wilfried Tsonga comprehensively beat him in the semi-finals 6–2, 6–3, 6–2.

ABN AMRO World Tennis Tournament 
Nadal then participated in his first indoor tournament of the year at the Rotterdam Open, Netherlands. Nadal beat Dmitry Tursunov 6–4, 6–4 in the first round before squandering a one-set lead to lose 6–3, 3–6, 4–6 to Italian Andreas Seppi.

Dubai Tennis Championships 
Nadal then returned to the Dubai Open, where he was a former champion. Nadal had won the title by beating Roger Federer in the 2006 Dubai Open, 2–6, 6–4, 6–4. This time around, however, his performance was less than impressive as he lost in the quarter-finals to American World No. 6 Andy Roddick. Nadal looked uncomfortable in his first-round match against Philipp Kohlschreiber, recovering from a one-set deficit to win 3–6, 6–1, 6–4. He then proceeded to push aside World No. 171 Mikhail Ledovskikh 6–4, 6–0, before losing to Roddick in the quarters, 6–7(5), 2–6.

Pacific Life Open 
In the first Masters Series event of the year, Nadal put in a consistent performance to reach the semi-finals. He beat Colombian Santiago Giraldo in the second round 6–3, 6–3, before defeating American Donald Young 6–1, 6–3 in the third round. Nadal then defeated Jo-Wilfried Tsonga in a rematch of their Australian Open semi-final match-up. Nadal stuttered for a while but regrouped to exact revenge on his opponent, 6–7(4), 7–6(3), 7–5. Nadal then defeated World No. 9 James Blake in the quarter-finals in three sets - 7–5, 3–6, 6–3. In the semi-finals, he fell to World No. 3 and the man he beat in the previous year's final, Novak Djokovic, 3–6, 2–6.

Sony Ericsson Open 
Nadal reached the final of Miami Masters for the second time in his career. He defeated German Benjamin Becker 7–5, 6–2 in the second round, followed by the demolition of another German, Nicolas Kiefer in the third round 6–2, 6–4. Nadal defeated James Blake for the second time in two weeks in the quarter-finals, and then beat big-hitting Czech Tomáš Berdych in the semi-finals, 7–6(6), 6–2. Nadal finally fell to long-time rival and the only man with a positive head-to-head against him (minimum 5 matches), Nikolay Davydenko, 4–6, 2–6.

Nadal then defeated Kiefer again at the Davis Cup World Group quarterfinals, 7–6(5), 6–0, 6–3.

European clay-court season

Monte-Carlo Rolex Masters 
Nadal was back on the surface of his choice, red clay. A magnificent run on the red clay would set him up for the great year he had.
Nadal won his fourth consecutive Monte Carlo Masters title. He lost just 29 games in 5 matches he played. Nadal received a bye into the second round, where he routed Croatian Mario Ančić 6–0, 6–3. Nadal then defeated fellow Spaniard and former World No. 1 Juan Carlos Ferrero in the second round, 6–4, 6–1. In the quarterfinals, Nadal beat World No. 5 David Ferrer 6–1, 7–5. Nadal then squandered just 5 games in a comprehensive defeat of Russian Nikolay Davydenko, before defeating long-time rival Roger Federer 7–5, 7–5 in the final to win his tenth Masters title.

Open Sabadell Atlántico Barcelona 
Nadal entered the Barcelona Open as the top seed for the first time in a tournament that year. Nadal stormed through the tournament losing just one set, and extended his winning streak to 10. He defeated a succession of top-50 players up to the semifinals, including Potito Starace, compatriot Feliciano López and Argentine Juan Ignacio Chela. He then thrashed World No. 85 Denis Gremelmayr, 6–1, 6–0, before winning the trophy by defeating David Ferrer for the second time in two weeks, 6–1, 4–6, 6–1.

Internazionali BNL d'Italia 
Nadal entered the Italian capital as a three-time defending champion. However, he fell in the second round to Juan Carlos Ferrero, 5–7, 1–6. This loss snapped his winning streak of 16 in the Italian capital.

Hamburg Masters 
Nadal won for the first time at the German city of Hamburg, flagging off his 32-match winning streak which would continue on till the Cincinnati Masters in August. Nadal beat Potito Starace in the second round for the second time that month. He then won a lopsided third-round match against future Grand Slam champion Andy Murray before defeating Carlos Moyá for the second time that season, 6–1, 6–3. Nadal then had two tough matches back-to-back, but came out on top on both occasions. He beat World No. 3 Novak Djokovic 7–5, 2–6, 6–2 in the semifinals. In the finals, he avenged his loss the previous year's championship match by beating Roger Federer, 7–5, 6–7(3), 6–3.

Roland Garros 
Nadal then entered the French Open as a three-time defending champion. Nadal's 2008 French Open is considered one of the greatest Grand Slam performances of all time. Nadal won every single set he played in the tournament, and dropped just 41 games en route to his fourth consecutive French Open title. Nadal defeated Brazilian Thomaz Bellucci in the first round for the loss of 9 games. He then walked past Frenchman Nicolas Devilder in the second round, and then Finn Jarkko Nieminen in the third round, for the total loss of just 10 games. Nadal then thrashed two fellow Spaniards, Fernando Verdasco and Nicolás Almagro back-to-back for the loss of just 6 games. In the semifinals, Nadal played the toughest match of his tournament, defeating Novak Djokovic 6–4, 6–2, 7–6(3) to book his spot in the final. Nadal then proceeded to win one of the most lopsided finals in tennis history, routing World No. 1 Roger Federer for the third consecutive year, 6–1, 6–3, 6–0.

Grass court season

Queen's Club Championships 
Nadal entered the Queen's Club tournament as a warm-up to Wimbledon. At the time, Nadal was riding a 12-match winning streak and by the end of the tournament, he would have lengthened the streak to 17. Nadal defeated Swede Jonas Björkman in the second round, before stumbling through his next two matches, beating Kei Nishikori in three sets in the third round and then 6'10 Ivo Karlović in three tie-break sets in the quarterfinals. Nadal then defeated another big server, Andy Roddick 7–5, 6–4 in the semifinals; finally winning his first ever grasscourt title by sidling past Novak Djokovic for the third time that year.

The Championships, Wimbledon 

Nadal entered the 2008 Wimbledon Championships as the two-time runner-up. He was riding a winning streak of 17 matches. Nadal had lost the previous two finals to Roger Federer, including the 2007 Wimbledon final, which was considered to be one of the great matches in recent times. Nadal defeated German Andreas Beck in the first round. He then lost his first set of the tournament in a tight second-round match against Latvian Ernests Gulbis. Nadal stormed through the rest of the tournament, thrashing Nicolas Kiefer, 7-6(3), 6-2, 6-3, Russian Mikhail Youzhny, 6-3, 6-3, 6-1 and future Wimbledon Champion Andy Murray, 6–3, 6-2, 6-4. Nadal then defeated surprise semifinalist Rainer Schüttler 6-1, 7-6(3), 6-4 to set up a third consecutive Wimbledon final with 5-time defending champion Roger Federer. Nadal then played what is considered the greatest match in tennis history, defeating Federer in a 4-hour, 48-minute match, 6-4, 6-4, 6-7(5), 6-7(8), 9-7 in the longest Wimbledon final in history. The win gave Nadal his first Grand Slam outside the French Open, and his fifth Grand Slam overall. The match is notable for its long, well-crafted rallies and the clutch shots produced on crucial points. Federer saved two match points in the fourth-set tie-break, but eventually caved on Nadal's fourth match-point. The two greatest passing shots of the tournament were hit back-to-back late into the fourth-set tiebreak. Nadal hit a clutch forehand pass to set up match-point on his own serve. Federer responded with a backhand pass to save the match-point. Federer eventually closed out the set, but lost the match. Many experts agree this match set Nadal up to the great success that would ensue in the following months.

Summer hard-court season

Rogers Cup 

Nadal rode his streak through the Toronto Masters event in Toronto, Canada. He received a bye into the second round where he routed home hope Jesse Levine, 6–4, 6–2. In the third round, Nadal thrashed Russian Igor Andreev 6–2, 7–6(1). Nadal then faced childhood rival Richard Gasquet in the quarterfinals. He lost the first set in an excruciatingly long tie-break, 6–7(12–14). However, he recovered immediately and pushed Gasquet aside by winning the next two sets 6–2, 6–1. In the semifinals, Nadal was matched up against up-and-comer Andy Murray. Nadal won 7–6, 6–3, reaching his third hard-court final of the year. The final was a contest between him and German Nicolas Kiefer. Nadal destroyed Kiefer 6–3, 6–2 to win his first hard-court title of the year and extend his streak to 29 match wins.

Western & Southern Financial Open 
Nadal next played at the only Masters tournament he has never reached the final at, the Cincinnati Masters. He strode through the draw, demolishing Frenchman Florent Serra for the loss of just one game and then taking down former World No. 2 Tommy Haas, 6–2, 7–6(1). In the quarterfinals, Nadal beat Ecuadorian Nicolás Lapentti in the last win of his streak. It finally ended when World No. 3 Novak Djokovic defeated Nadal in the semifinals, 6–1, 7–5.

Photos

All Matches

Singles matches

Doubles matches

See also
 2008 ATP World Tour
 2008 Roger Federer tennis season
 2008 Novak Djokovic tennis season

References

External links 
 
ATP tour profile

Rafael Nadal tennis seasons
Nadal, Rafael
Medalists at the 2008 Summer Olympics
Tennis players at the 2008 Summer Olympics
Nadal
2008 in Spanish sport